Gozu Tennō (牛頭天王, lit. "Ox-Headed Heavenly King") is a syncretic Japanese deity of disease and healing. Originally imported to Japan from mainland Asia, he was regarded since the Heian period both as a causer of and protector against epidemics and eventually became amalgamated with the native kami Susanoo during the medieval and early modern periods. During the Meiji period, when the government mandated the separation of Shinto and Buddhism, Shinto shrines dedicated to Gozu Tennō of the Gion cult tradition such as Yasaka Shrine in the Gion district of Kyoto or Tsushima Shrine in Tsushima, Aichi Prefecture officially reidentified their enshrined deity as Susanoo.

Overview

The origins and early development of the Gozu Tennō cult before it reached Japan, as well as the process of his amalgamation with other deities, are unclear and a matter of debate. One theory for instance claims that Gozu Tennō was originally a minor Buddhist deity regarded as the protector of the monastery (vihara) of Jetavana, with his Sanskrit name being reconstructed either as 'Gavagrīva' ("Ox-Necked") or 'Gośirsa Devarāja' ("Ox-Headed Divine King", a calque of 'Gozu Tennō'). From India, the deity's cult was supposedly transmitted to Japan via Tibet and China, where it was influenced by esoteric Buddhism and Taoism. Another theory proposes a Korean origin for the deity.

Gozu Tennō was historically identified with a number of deities, foremost among these being Susanoo, the impetuous storm god of classical Japanese mythology, and Mutō-no-Kami (武塔神), an obscure deity who appears in the legend of Somin Shōrai. The story relates that Mutō was a god from the northern sea who stayed at the house of a poor man named Somin Shōrai after Somin Shōrai's wealthy brother refused to give him lodgings. Mutō later provided Somin Shōrai's family a magical means to save themselves from future epidemics as a reward for their hospitality and slew the rich man who rejected him. The earliest extant version of this legend dating from the Nara period (surviving in an extract quoted in a medieval work) has Mutō revealing himself to be Susanoo, suggesting that the two deities were already being conflated during the 8th century, if not earlier. Sources that equate Gozu Tennō with Susanoo first appear during the Kamakura period (1185–1333), although one theory supposes that these three gods and various other disease-related deities were already loosely coalesced around the 9th century, probably around the year 877 when a major epidemic swept through Japan. In later versions of the Somin Shōrai legend, the deity in the story came to be identified as Gozu Tennō, who at this stage had become more or less synonymous with both Susanoo and Mutō (though one source instead applies the name 'Mutō' to Gozu Tennō's father).

The idea that Gozu Tennō had Korean roots stems in part from his association with these two gods. Mutō's name for instance is believed to derive from the Korean word mudang, "shamaness", while a story recorded in the Nihon Shoki (720 CE) claims that Susanoo, after his banishment from heaven, came down to a place called 'Soshimori' in the land of Silla and from there crossed the sea to Japan. Indeed, the epithet gozu ("ox-head(ed)") has been explained as being derived from 'Soshimori', here interpreted as a Korean toponym meaning "Bull's (so) Head (mari)".

Iconography

Gozu Tennō was usually portrayed as a fierce-looking man with the head of an ox above his head. He is sometimes shown wielding an axe in one hand and a noose or lasso in the other, though other depictions may instead show him brandishing a sword or a halberd. He may be clad either in Indian-style garments, a suit of armor, or (rarely) in Japanese (Heian period) clothing. Some artworks might depict the deity with multiple arms and heads: a late Heian period statue in Sakai, Osaka Prefecture for instance shows him with three faces and four arms. Another statue in Tsushima, Aichi Prefecture depicts him with twelve arms, four heads (two fierce human heads each with a single horn, a horse's head, and an ox's head), and bird talons for feet. An ink drawing on a wooden panel (dating from 1490) which portrays the god with five heads is preserved in a temple in Konan, Shiga Prefecture.

Several early modern depictions of Susanoo identify the deity as Gozu Tennō and may even exhibit iconographic traits of the latter (e.g. the ox's head) such as the first two images in this article.

Consort and offspring

The oldest version of the Somin Shōrai legend portrays the god Mutō as marrying the daughter of the god of the southern seas. In later forms of this story featuring Gozu Tennō, the princess is given the name Harisaijo (頗梨采女 or 波利采女, also known as 'Harisainyo' or 'Barisainyo') or 'Harisai Tennyo' (頗梨采天女) and is identified as the third daughter of the dragon (nāga) king Sāgara. As Gozu Tennō was amalgamated with Susanoo, Harisaijo was in turn identified with Susanoo's wife Kushinadahime. Harisaijo was also associated with the Onmyōdō goddess Toshitokujin (歳徳神), the presiding deity of the New Year.

Gozu Tennō is said to have had eight children with Harisaijo, collectively known as the 'Hachiōji' (八王子, lit. "Eight Princes"). These deities were  amalgamated with both the Hasshōshin (八将神, "Eight Divine Generals"), the guardians of the eight directions in Onmyōdō, and eight of Susanoo's sons and daughters (Yashimajinumi, I(so)takeru, Ōya(tsu)hime, Tsumatsuhime, Ōtoshi, Ukanomitama, Ōyabiko, and Suseribime).

Legacy
Hachiōji Castle, located in the city of Hachiōji (which gets its name from this castle) in western Tokyo, is named after Gozu Tennō's children. Legend states that a monk named Myōkō (妙行) had a vision of Gozu Tennō and the Hachiōji while meditating at the hill where the castle would later be built, Shiroyama (formerly also known as Fukazawayama), during the early 10th century.

See also
Yamantaka
Gomukha
Shennong
Yasaka Shrine
Gion Matsuri
Gion cult
Amabie
Ox-Head and Horse-Face
Minotaur

References

External links
Gozu Tennō, Encyclopedia of Shinto (Kokugakuin University)
Gion Shinkō Kenkyū-kai (Gion Faith Research Center, in Japanese)
Official Website of Hiromine Shrine (Japanese)
Official Website of Take-dera Temple (Japanese)
Official Website of Tsushima Shrine (Japanese)
Official Website of Yasaka Shrine (Japanese)

Buddhism in Japan
Japanese gods
Health gods
Plague gods
Buddhist gods
Onmyōdō deities
Shinbutsu bunri
Shinbutsu shūgō
Gion faith